Qaleh Meseh (also Romanized as Qal‘eh Meseh; also known as Qal‘eh Mes) is a village in Simakan Rural District, in the Central District of Bavanat County, Fars Province, Iran. At the 2006 census, its population was 93, in 23 families.

References 

Populated places in Bavanat County